Christian Giudice (born June 5, 1974) is an American boxing writer and editor who has published boxing biographies. The biopic film Hands of Stone was based on Giudice's book with the same title.

Raised in Haddonfield, New Jersey, Giudice attended Haddonfield Memorial High School.

Books
Hands of Stone:The Life and Legend of Roberto Duran - about boxer Roberto Durán
Beloved Warrior:The Rise and Fall of Alexis Arguello - about boxer and politician Alexis Arguello
A Fire Burns Within - about boxer Wilfredo Gómez
Female Leaders in New Religious Movements (Palgrave Studies in New Religions and Alternative Spiritualities) (written by Inga Bårdsen Tøllefsen, Giudice edited the book for English speaking readers)
Macho Time: The meteoric rise and Tragic Fall of Hector Camacho - about boxer Hector Camacho

References

1974 births
American sportswriters
Living people
Boxing writers
American book editors
Haddonfield Memorial High School alumni
People from Haddonfield, New Jersey
Writers from New Jersey